Frohmuhl is a commune in the Bas-Rhin department in Grand Est in north-eastern France.

The commune lies within the Northern Vosges Regional Nature Park.

Geography
A typical valley village set in the pink Lorraine Plateau sandstone, Frohmuhl, like many villages in north-western Alsace, is cut in two by the railway line connecting Strasbourg and Sarreguemines and by the River Eichel.   Road access is provided by the departmental road D919.

Agriculture was abandoned here during the second half of the twentieth and the surrounding hills are newly afforested.   However, Highland Cattle are currently reared in residual open areas at the bottom of the valley.

Adjacent communes are Puberg and Hinsbourg to the east, Struth and Tieffenbach to the south-west and Weislingen to the north-west.

See also
 Communes of the Bas-Rhin department

References

Communes of Bas-Rhin
Bas-Rhin communes articles needing translation from French Wikipedia